This is the list of episodes for the Food Network Canada competition reality series Chopped Canada.

Series overview

Episodes

Season 1

Season 2

Season 3 Teen Tournament

Season 3

See also
List of Chopped episodes
List of Chopped Junior episodes
List of Chopped Sweets episodes

References

External links
 Chopped Canada episode guide at FoodNetwork.com
 Chopped Canada Teens Tournaments episode guide at TVGuide.com

Lists of food television series episodes
Chopped